Forsyte is included in:
 The Forsyte Saga, a series of British novels
 USS Irene Forsyte (IX-93), an ill-fated North American schooner

See also 
 Forsyth (disambiguation)
 Forsythe (disambiguation)